Conizonia albolineata is a species of beetle in the family Cerambycidae. It was described by Hampe in 1852, originally under the genus Phytoecia. It is known from Iran, Armenia, and Turkey. It contains the varietas Conizonia albolineata var. fulvolineata.

References

Saperdini
Beetles described in 1852